Go is the eleventh studio album, and twelfth album overall, by American rock singer Pat Benatar, released in the summer of 2003. Her first release since Innamorata (1997), it stands as her most recent album to date (though she has released singles periodically) and her only album not available for digital purchase or on music streaming platforms, as of 2022.

Track listing 
All songs written by Pat Benatar and Neil Giraldo, except as noted.
 "Go" - 3:54
 "Brave" - 4:33
 "I Won't" - 4:43
 "Have It All" - 4:31
 "Sorry" (Benatar, Giraldo, Paul Rafferty) - 5:28
 "Please Don't Leave Me" - 5:26
 "Girl" (Giraldo, Holly Knight) - 4:51
 "Out of the Ruins" - 2:47
 "In My Dreams" - 5:52
 "Tell Me" - 4:44
 "Brokenhearted" - 5:45
 "Christmas in America" (Radio Edit) - 4:03 (hidden track)

Personnel

Musicians
 Pat Benatar – vocals
 Neil Giraldo – guitars, keyboards, bass, backing vocals, strings arrangements
 Mick Mahan – bass
 Ray Brinker, Denny Fongheiser, Dave Karasony, Matt Laug – drums, percussion

Production
 Neil Giraldo – producer
 Chris Fuhrman, Spyder Whitehorse – engineers, digital editing
Barry Rudolph – engineer, mixing
 Jeff Worrell – digital editing
 Steve Hall – mastering

Charts

References

2003 albums
Pat Benatar albums